The Nelson Electric Tramway is a heritage railway at Nelson in the Kootenay region of southeastern British Columbia. It is one of two operational historic tram systems in the province.

Former tramway
1899: Nelson Electric Tramway Co. Ltd. inaugurated service along Front St. on December 21. Opening of the hill section was postponed after Car 2 derailed causing serious injuries.
1900: Hill section opened on April 8. 
1905: City contracted to operate the system for four years, because the company had incurred losses every year.
1908: A fire in the substation on April 25 caused extensive damage. A fire in the car barn on April 27 destroyed the building and two streetcars. Service was suspended.
1910: Newly formed Nelson Street Railway Co. reopened the system on November 8.
1914: City purchased the system on February 1, because the company had incurred ongoing losses.
1949: Final run when diesel buses replaced rails on June 20.

Heritage timeline
1980: Private owner wished to dispose of Car 23 and the bridge from the Nasookin. The city considered acquiring the former for restoration as a bus stop shelter.
1982: Chamber of commerce acquired and moved Car 23 to an indoor facility at Selkirk College. The chamber and college obtained a federal grant to begin restoration. 
1984: Second federal grant for $26,000 received. 
1985: Project shifted from producing a static exhibit to an operational car. 
1987: Third federal grant for $104,000 received. 
1988: Car 23 moved into a temporary car barn on the southeast corner of Hall and Front streets. The Nelson Electric Tramway Society incorporated. The chamber gave the society title to the facility, and various tramway artifacts. 
1989: Provincial grant for $430,000 received. Canadian Pacific Railway (CP) donated rails salvaged from the Rosebery–Nakusp line abandonment.
1990: CP employee volunteers began laying track. Permanent car barn built and Car 23 moved in. Car 400 arrived.
1991: Chamber transferred ownership of Car 23 to the society. Track laying completed.
1992: Overhead wiring and substation completed. On June 15, passenger service began. On July 1, the official opening was held.
2011: Annual ridership set a record of over 15,000.
2012: Spring flooding along the lakeshore caused $15,000 in damages to the streetcar tracks and the storage barn, plus about $7,500 in lost revenue because of a two-month shortening of the tourism season.
2015: Car barn museum (Walt Laurie Memorial Museum) opened, displaying artifacts and photos within a dedicated space and also throughout the barn.

Operation
The non-profit Nelson Electric Tramway Society (NETS), which adopted the name of the town's first streetcar company, was the first operating heritage streetcar line in BC. Since the 2011 closure of the Vancouver Downtown Historic Railway, only one other system remains (Fraser Valley Heritage Railway). The Nelson Electric Tramway is the only one that is powered by an overhead wire. 

The single-track railway runs along Nelson's waterfront from a loop under the orange bridge (at the northeast end of Rotary Heritage Park) to a loop at Hall St. (adjacent to the northeast perimeter of the airport). The society has two restored vintage streetcars. The service is seasonal, starting on the May long weekend and ending on the Canadian Thanksgiving weekend.

Fleet

Car 23
Car 23 was built in 1906 by the John Stephenson Company (then owned by the J. G. Brill Company). Originally purchased by Cleveland, Ohio's short-lived Forest City Railway (fleet No. 3334), the car was purchased in 1923 by the City of Nelson and used as a spare, or back-up tram.  In 1930 the car was renumbered from "3" to "23", and it remained in service until the 1949 closure of the system. In 1951 the car's body was sold and turned into a dog kennel and eventually a chicken coop. Acquired in poor condition in 1982, the car body was restored. Later, replica trucks were fabricated, so that the car could be returned to operating condition.

Car 400
Birney-type car 400 was originally ordered in 1921 by the British Columbia Electric Railway (BCER) from the Preston Car Company.  The car was manufactured in Preston, Ontario, and shipped in parts to the BCER for final assembly at their yards in Vancouver before entering service in Victoria, British Columbia in March 1922.  The car was retired from service in 1948, then sold to the Mayo Lumber Company in Cowichan Lake to be used as a bunkhouse.  Purchased in 1970 by the provincial museum, the car was restored in 1973 for static display.  Purchased by the society in 1990, the car was restored to operating condition. By 1999, this work was nearly completed, and the car was expected to be placed into service in 2000, but various issues subsequently delayed the car's entry into passenger service until 2005 or later.  As of August 2022, car 400 is not in regular service, as it’s short wheelbase can not make it around the sharp curvature of the terminus loops. All scheduled trips use car 23.

See also
 List of street railways in Canada
 Streetcars in North America

Footnotes

References

External links
 Official website

Heritage railways in British Columbia
Nelson, British Columbia
Heritage streetcar systems
Railway lines opened in 1992
Streetcars in Canada
Street railways in British Columbia
1992 establishments in British Columbia
Electric railways in Canada